The Pavillon de l'Arsenal is the Paris Center for architecture and urbanism, a center for urban planning and museum located in the 4th arrondissement at 21, boulevard Morland, Paris, France. It is open daily except Mondays; admission is free.

The museum building was built in 1878-1879 for Laurent-Louis Borniche, wood merchant and amateur painter, near the former site of a Celestine monastic community turned arsenal. In 1988 it became a center for documentation and exhibitions related to urban planning and the architecture of Paris.

Today the museum's activities include operating its exhibitions, publishing reference books on issues related to the daily life of Parisians, and providing a forum for individuals and authorities involved in the city's urban planning. Its permanent exhibit (800 m²) displays Parisian architecture and shows how the city has evolved. Three additional spaces are used for temporary exhibits on topics including housing in Paris, the Paris of Baron Haussmann and of private homes, projects for Paris 2012, and other aspects of French and international architecture.

See also 
 List of museums in Paris

References 
 Paris.org description
 Barry Bergdoll, "Paris: Pavillon de l'Arsenal La Ville et ses Projets/A City in the Making", The Journal of the Society of Architectural Historians, Vol. 53, No. 3 (September 1994), pp. 350–352.

External links 

 Pavillon de l'Arsenal

Museums in Paris
Architecture museums
History museums in France
Art museums established in 1988
1988 establishments in France
Urban planning museums
Buildings and structures in the 4th arrondissement of Paris